Carl Wayne Warwick (born February 27, 1937) is an American former professional baseball outfielder. He played six seasons in Major League Baseball (MLB) from 1961 to 1966 for the Los Angeles Dodgers, St. Louis Cardinals, Houston Colt .45s, Baltimore Orioles and Chicago Cubs. During the 1964 World Series, he set a record by reaching base in his first four plate appearances (three singles and one base on balls) as a pinch hitter, as he helped his Cardinals defeat the New York Yankees in seven games.

Playing career
Born in Dallas, Texas, he graduated from Sunset High School and then played varsity baseball for Texas Christian University, leaving after his junior season to sign a bonus contract with the Dodgers. In his second pro season, 1959 with the Victoria Rosebuds, he led the Double-A Texas League in runs scored (129) and home runs (35), hit .331 and was selected Most Valuable Player. The following year, playing with the Triple-A St. Paul Saints, he was named an American Association all-star.

Struggling at the plate, he spent 52 games tuning up his batting stroke with the Triple-A Charleston Marlins. He then spent the next four full seasons at the major league level.

In , in another early-season trade, the Cardinals dealt him to the expansion Colt .45s on May 7. Back in his native Texas, Warwick became Houston's regular center fielder, starting in 104 games, and his 16 home runs ranked second on the club (to Román Mejías' 24). He appeared in 88 games (49 defensively), and had 11 hits in 43 at bats in a pinch hitting role, as St. Louis put on a late-season surge to win the National League pennant on the closing day of the season.

1964 World Series
Then, in the 1964 World Series, Warwick was called on to pinch hit five times by manager Johnny Keane.  He reached base four times in his first four appearances. His sixth-inning pinch single in Game 1 off Al Downing drove home the go-ahead run in the Cardinals' 9–5 triumph.  He also singled and scored a run in Game 2 against Mel Stottlemyre, drew a base on balls from Jim Bouton in Game 3 and singled again off Downing in Game 4, to spark a rally capped by Ken Boyer's grand slam home run in a 4–3 Cardinal win.  He fouled out off Bouton in Game 6 to complete a Series in which he batted .750 with an .800 on-base percentage, two runs scored and an RBI.

The 1964 World Series was the high-water mark of Warwick's baseball career.  He batted only .132 in a  season split between the Cardinals and Orioles, and then .227 in 16 games for the last-place  Cubs. His contract was purchased by the Orioles from the Cardinals on July 24, 1965. He appeared in nine games but was hitless in fourteen at bats. He made it on base only on three walks but scored each time. He was traded from the Orioles to the Cubs for Vic Roznovsky on March 31, 1966. He retired from baseball prior to the 1967 season, returning to Houston and operating real estate and travel agencies.

In the majors, Warwick collected 363 hits, including 51 doubles, ten triples, 31 home runs and 149 RBI.

References

External links

1937 births
Living people
Baltimore Orioles players
Baseball players from Dallas
Charleston Marlins players
Chicago Cubs players
Dallas–Fort Worth Spurs players
Houston Colt .45s players
Los Angeles Dodgers players
Macon Dodgers players
Major League Baseball outfielders
St. Louis Cardinals players
St. Paul Saints (AA) players
Tacoma Cubs players
TCU Horned Frogs baseball players
Victoria Rosebuds players